Gunnar Sandgren (27 June 1929 – 4 November 2016) was a Swedish journalist, novelist and playwright.

Biography
Gunnar Ernst Algot Sandgren was born in Ölmstad  parish in  Jönköping County, Sweden. He was the son of Ernst Sandgren and Signhild Nilsson. He first worked as a journalist at Svenska Dagbladet from 1952. 
He made his literary debut in 1960, with the novel Förklaringsberget. He later wrote a series of historical novels. Bonniers published his books for the next 30 years.

During the 1970s, Sandgren worked for Sveriges Television where he and wrote a number of plays. He later he turned to classical theater where several of his plays attracted attention.
He was awarded the Dobloug Prize in 1981.

References

1929 births
2016 deaths
People from Jönköping County
Swedish journalists
20th-century Swedish dramatists and playwrights
Swedish male novelists
Swedish male dramatists and playwrights
20th-century Swedish novelists
20th-century Swedish male writers
Dobloug Prize winners